DCB may stand for:
 Dame Commander of the Order of the Bath
 Development Credit Bank, a private-sector bank in India
 David Campbell Bannerman (born 1960), a British politician
 David Crowder Band, a Christian rock band
 Dictionary of Canadian Biography
 Dead cat bounce, a figurative term used by traders in the finance industry
 Dulwich College Beijing, a British international school in Beijing, China
 Dope Circle Boyz, a Finnish hip-hop group

In science and technology 
 Disconnecting circuit breaker, a high-voltage circuit breaker with disconnectors integrated into the breaking chamber
 Data center bridging, in computer networking
 Data Control Block, a data structure for accessing data sets on IBM mainframes
 Double Cantilever Beam, a test specimen in fracture mechanics
 Dichlorobenzene
 Digital Control Bus, a proprietary MIDI-like interface by Roland Corporation
 Direct Copper Bonding, also Direct Bonding Copper, a type of power electronic substrate
 Direct Carrier Billing, a method of doing digital financial transactions
 Dithionite-Citrate-Bicarbonate method used for iron oxide removal from clays in soil science